Zhivago or Zivago may refer to:

People
 Zhivago Duncan (born 1980), American artist
 Zhivago Groenewald (born 1993), Namibian cricketer
 Semen Zhivago (1807–1863), Russian painter
 Mr. Zivago (born 1961), Italian singer

Arts and entertainment

Creative works
 Doctor Zhivago, the title of a novel by Boris Pasternak and its various adaptations
 Doctor Zhivago (novel), a 1957 novel by Boris Pasternak
 Doctor Zhivago (film),  a 1965 epic romantic drama film directed by David Lean with a screenplay by Robert Bolt
 Doctor Zhivago (TV series), a 2002 British drama television series directed by Giacomo Campiotti and starring Hans Matheson, Keira Knightley and Sam Neill
 Doctor Zhivago (musical), a 2011 musical composed by Lucy Simon, lyrics by Michael Korie and Amy Powers, book by Michael Weller
 Mademoiselle Zhivago, a 2010 album by Lara Fabian

Fictional characters
 Yuri Zhivago, the protagonist and title character of the novel Doctor Zhivago
 Zhivago, a character in the manga series The Seven Deadly Sins

Other uses
 Zhivago shirt, a Russian folk shirt

See also
 Kostyantyn Zhevago (born 1974), Ukrainian politician
 Zhi-Vago, a German dream trance music band
 Zhivargo Laing (born 1967), Bahamian politician